The 2021–22 Wyoming Cowgirls basketball team represents the University of Wyoming in the 2021–22 college basketball season. The Cowgirls are led by head coach Gerald Mattinson, in his third season. The Cowgirls play their home games at the Arena-Auditorium and are members of the Mountain West Conference. The Cowgirls finished tied for 3rd in the Mountain West Conference, but exited the Mountain West Conference Women's Basketball tournament in the quarterfinal round, losing to Colorado State 51-38 due to an embarrassing 4th quarter performance.

Previous season
The Cowgirls finished the 2020–21 season 14–10, 8–8 in Mountain West play to finish in seventh place in the conference. They defeated Utah State, UNLV, Boise State, and Fresno State to win the 2021 Mountain West Conference women's basketball tournament, the first in program history. The Cowgirls lost to UCLA in the Round of 64 of the NCAA tournament.

Offseason

Departures

Arrivals

Wyoming was selected to finish fifth in the Mountain West preseason poll, and no Cowgirls were selected to the preseason all-conference team.

Roster

Statistics

Schedule

|-
!colspan=9 style=| Exhibition

|-
!colspan=9 style=| Non–Conference

|-
!colspan=9 style=| Mountain West Conference

|-
!colspan=9 style=| Mountain West Women's Tournament

|-
!colspan=9 style=| WNIT

References

Wyoming
Wyoming Cowgirls basketball seasons
Wyoming Cowgirls
Wyoming Cowgirls
Wyoming